Dancing with the Stars is a Greek reality show airing on ANT1 and filmed live in Athens. The show is based on the United Kingdom BBC Television series Strictly Come Dancing and is part of BBC Worldwide's Dancing with the Stars franchise. The theme song is "It's personal" performed by Swedish indie pop band The Radio Dept. The first season of the show was in spring 2010.

Judges
Alexis Kostalas, announcer, sports commentator
Galena Velikova, choreographer, dancer, dance teacher
Giannis Latsios, ANT1 television program manager
Fokas Evagelinos, choreographer, dancer, dance teacher

Couples

Scoring chart

Red numbers indicate the lowest score for each week.
Green numbers indicate the highest score for each week.
 indicates the couple eliminated that week.
 indicates the returning couple that finished in the bottom two.
 indicates the winning couple.
 indicates the runner-up couple.
 indicates the third-place couple.
 indicates the couple didn't dance this week.
 indicates the couple withdrew.
 recap episode.

In episode 1 there were three judges (Alexis Kostalas was not present) and also no elimination.
In episode 2 both Matthildi & Richard and Kostas & Tzeni didn't dance.
In episode 3 Matthildi & Richard and Kostas & Tzeni fall two places on the scoring chart because they didn't dance on the previous show.
Episode 6 was the recap episode.
In episode 9 there were three judges (Fokas Evaggelinos was not present).

Dances
1st week: Cha Cha and Tango.

2nd week: Waltz and Jive.

3rd week: Rumba and Quickstep.

4th week: Paso Doble and Foxtrot.

5th week: Free Style.

6th week: Rock 'n Roll and Mambo.

7th week: Viennese Waltz and Samba.

8th week: Erica-Theodoris, Stamatis-Efi: Quickstep and Rumba. Eugenia-Elias: Paso Doble and Waltz.  Savvas-Emily: Waltz and Mambo. Mathildi-Richard: Tango and Cha Cha. Mike-Anna: Foxtrot and Paso Doble.

9th week: Erica-Theodoris: Paso Doble and Foxtrot. Stamatis-Efi: Samba and Tango. Eugenia-Elias: Tango and Cha Cha. Mathildi-Richard: Viennese Waltz and Samba. Mike-Anna: Cha Cha and Quickstep.

10th week: First run: Free Style.   Second run: Erica-Theodoris: Quickstep, Mathildi-Richard: Rock 'n Roll, Eugenia-Elias: Rumba, Stamatis-Efi: Mambo.

11th week: First run: Free Style.   Second run: Eugenia-Elias: Mambo, Erica-Theodoris: Viennese Waltz, Mathildi-Richard: Paso Doble.

12th week: First run: Erica-Theodoris: Waltz, Mathildi-Richard: Tango.  Second run: Erica-Theodoris: Paso Doble, Mathildi-Richard: Cha Cha. Third run: Erica-Theodoris and Mathildi-Richard: Free Style (The same song:Mesa Sou:Stavento).

Ratings

Footnotes

Season 01
2010 Greek television seasons